The History of Dalmatia concerns the history of the area that covers eastern coast of the Adriatic Sea and its inland regions, from the 2nd century BC up to the present day.

The earliest mention of Dalmatia as a province came after its establishment as part of the Roman Empire. Dalmatia was ravaged by barbaric tribes in the beginning of the 4th century. Slavs settled in the area in the 6th century, the White Croats settled Dalmatia the following century. In 1527 the Kingdom of Croatia became a Habsburg crown land, and in 1812 the Kingdom of Dalmatia was formed. In 1918, Dalmatia was a part of the State of Slovenes, Croats and Serbs, then the Kingdom of Yugoslavia. After World War II, Dalmatia became part of Socialist Federal Republic of Yugoslavia in SR Croatia.

Classical antiquity

The history of Dalmatia began in 180 BC when the tribe from which the country derives its name declared itself independent of Gentius, the Illyrian king, and established a republic. Its capital was Delminium (current name Tomislavgrad); its territory stretched northwards from the river Neretva to the river Cetina, and later to the Krka, where it met the confines of Liburnia.

Roman domination

The Roman Empire began its occupation of Illyria in the year 168 BC, forming the Roman province of Illyricum. In 156 BC the Dalmatians were for the first time attacked by a Roman army and compelled to pay tribute. In AD 10, during the reign of Augustus, Illyricum was split into Pannonia in the north and Dalmatia in the south, after the last of many uprisings known collectively as the Great Illyrian Revolt had been crushed by Tiberius in AD 9. Following the end of the revolt, there was general acceptance of the Latin civilisation throughout Illyria and submission to the Roman Empire.

The province of Dalmatia spread inland to cover all of the Dinaric Alps and most of the eastern Adriatic coast. Its capital was the city of Salona (Solin). Emperor Diocletian made Dalmatia famous by building a palace for himself a few kilometers south of Salona, in Aspalathos/Spalatum. Other Dalmatian cities at the time were: Tarsatica, Senia, Vegium, Aenona, Iader, Scardona, Tragurium, Aequum, Oneum, Issa, Pharus, Bona, Corcyra Nigra, Narona, Epidaurus, Rhizinium, Acruvium, Olcinium, Scodra, Epidamnus/Dyrrachium.

The Roman Emperor Diocletian (ruled AD 284 to 305) reformed the government in the late Roman Empire and established the Tetrarchy. This new system for the first time divided rule of the empire into the Western and Eastern courts, each headed by a person with the title of Augustus. Each of the two Augusti also had an appointed successor, a Caesar, who administered about half the district belonging to his own Augustus (and was subordinate to him). In Diocletian's division, Dalmatia fell under the rule of the Eastern Court, headed by Diocletian, but was administered by his Caesar and appointed successor Galerius, who had his seat in the city of Sirmium. In AD 395, the Emperor Theodosius I permanently divided Imperial rule by granting his two sons the position of Augusti separately in the West and the East. This time, however, Spalatum and Dalmatia fell under the Western Court of Honorius, not the Eastern Court.

In 468 Flavius Julius Nepos became the ruler of the Province of Dalmatia. Four years later, in the spring of 472, the Western Emperor Anthemius was murdered by his Germanic general Ricimer; the appointment of his successor legally fell to Emperor Leo I the Thracian of the Eastern Court. Leo however tarried in his appointment. Ricimer, along with his nephew Gundobad, appointed Olybrius and then Glycerius as their puppet emperors in the West. This was not recognized by Leo I and the Eastern Court, who considered them usurpers. In 473 Leo appointed Flavius Julius Nepos, the ruler of Dalmatia, as the legal Western Emperor. In June 474, Nepos sailed across the Adriatic, entered Ravenna (the seat of the Western court), forced Glycerius to abdicate, and secured the throne. However, next year his Magister militum Orestes forced Nepos to flee back to Salona (on 28 August 475). Romulus Augustulus, the son of Orestes, was proclaimed Emperor within a few months, but was deposed the following year after the execution of his father. Odoacer, the general who deposed Romulus Augustulus, did not appoint a puppet emperor, but instead, for his part, abolished the Western court altogether. Julius Nepos, however, continued to rule in Dalmatia until 480 as the sole legal Emperor of the West (Dalmatia still being de jure a part of the Western court's administration).

After the death of Julius Nepos in AD 480, the Empire was formally reunited under the rule of a single throne, under Emperor Zeno in Constantinople. Dalmatia continued as a Roman possession, ruled from Constantinople, and was thus part of the state referred to in historiography as the Byzantine Empire (although historically it continued to be known as the "Roman Empire" throughout its existence). The collapse of the Western Empire left this region subject to Gothic rulers, Odoacer and Theodoric the Great, from 480 to 535, when it was added by Justinian I to the Eastern (Byzantine) Empire.

Around AD 639 the hinterland of Dalmatia fell after the invasion of Avars and Slavs, and the city of Salona was sacked. The majority of the displaced citizens fled by sea to the nearby Adriatic islands. Following the return of Byzantine rule to the area, the Roman population returned to the mainland under the leadership of the nobleman known as Severus the Great. They chose to inhabit Diocletian's Palace in Spalatum, because of its strong fortifications and defendable setting. The palace had been long-deserted by this time, and the interior was converted into a city by the Salona refugees, rendering Spalatum the effective capital of the Province.

Throughout the following centuries, effectively until the early 13th century and the Fourth Crusade, Spalatum would remain a possession of the Byzantine emperors, even though its hinterland would seldom be under Byzantine control, and de facto suzerainty over the city would often be exercised by Croatian, Venetian, or Hungarian rulers. Overall, the city enjoyed significant autonomy during this time, due to the periodic weakness and/or preoccupation of the Byzantine Imperial administration.

Middle Ages

Following the great Slavic migration into Illyria in the first half of the 6th century, Dalmatia became distinctly divided between two different communities:
 The hinterland populated by Slavic tribes - which were roughly Croats. There were also the Romanized Illyrian natives, and Celts in the north.
 The Byzantine enclaves populated by the native Romance-speaking descendants of Romans and Illyrians (speaking Dalmatian), who lived safely in Ragusa, Iadera, Tragurium, Spalatum and some other coastal towns, like Cattaro.

Croatian Dalmatia

The Slavs that migrated soon formed their own realm, the Principality of Littoral Croatia, ruled by Slavic princes. A separate tribe called Guduscani lived in the northwestern part of Roman Dalmatia. Borna of Croatia (803–821) was one of the earliest recorded rulers of the Principality of Littoral Croatia. In 806 the Principality of Dalmatia was temporarily added to the Frankish Empire, but the cities were restored to Byzantium by the Treaty of Aachen in 812. The treaty had also slightly expanded the Principality of Dalmatia eastwards.

The establishment of cordial relations between the cities and the Croatian dukedom began with the reign of Duke Mislav (835), who signed an official peace treaty with Pietro, doge of Venice in 840 and who also started giving land donations to the churches from the cities.

Dalmatia's Croatian Duke Trpimir (ruled 845–864), founder of the House of Trpimir, greatly expanded the new Duchy to include territories all the way to the river of Drina, thereby covering the entirety of Bosnia in his wars against the Bulgar Khans and their Serbian subjects.

The Saracens had raided the southernmost cities in 840 and 842, but this threat was eliminated by a common Frankish-Byzantine campaign of 871.

Duke of Croats Tomislav had created the Kingdom of Croatia in 924 or 925, and was crowned in Tomislavgrad after defending and annexing the Principality of Pannonia. His powerful realm extended influence further southwards to Duklja.

As the Littoral Croatian Duchy became a Kingdom after 925, its capitals were in Dalmatia: Biaći, Nin, Split, Knin, Solin and elsewhere. Also, the Croatian noble tribes, who had a right to choose Croatian duke (later the king), were from Dalmatia: Karinjani and Lapčani, Polečići, Tugomirići, Kukari, Snačići, Gusići, Šubići (from which later developed very powerful noble family Zrinski), Mogorovići, Lačničići, Jamometići and Kačić. Within the borders of ancient Roman Dalmatia, the Croatian nobles of Krk, or Krčki (from which later developed very powerful noble family Frankopan) were from Dalmatia as well.

Meanwhile, the Croatian kings exacted tribute from the Byzantine cities, Tragurium, Iadera and others, and consolidated their own power in the purely Croatian-settled towns such as Nin, Biograd and Šibenik. The city of Šibenik was founded by Croatian kings. They also ascertained control over the bordering southern duchies. Rulers of the medieval Croatian state who had control over the Dalmatian littoral and the cities were the dukes Trpimir, Domagoj, Branimir, and the kings Tomislav, Trpimir II, Krešimir I, Stjepan Držislav, Petar Krešimir IV and Dmitar Zvonimir.

Southern Dalmatia

The area of Southern Dalmatia was divided among four small principalities called Pagania, Zahumlje, Travunia and Duklja. Pagania was a minor duchy between Cetina and Neretva. The territories of Zahumlje and Travunia spread much further inland than the current borders of Dalmatia. Duklja (the Roman Doclea) began south of Dubrovnik and spread down to the Skadar Lake.

Pagania

Pagania was given its name because of the paganism of its inhabitants, when neighbouring tribes were Christian. The pirate-like people of Pagania/Narenta (named after river Narenta) expressed their buccaneering capabilities by pirateering the Venetian-controlled Adriatic between 827 and 828, while the Venetian fleet was further afield, in the Sicilian waters. As soon as the fleet of the Venetian Republic returned, the Neretvians fell back; when the Venetians left, the Neretvians would immediately embark on new raids. In 834 and 835, they caught and killed several Venetian traders returning from Benevent. To punish the Neretvians, the Venetian Doge launched a military expedition against them in 839. The war continued with the inclusion of the Dalmatian Croats, but a truce was quickly signed, although, only with the Dalmatian Croats and some of the Pagan tribes. In 840, the Venetians launched an expedition against the Neretvian Prince Ljudislav, but without success. In 846, a new operation was launched that raided the Slavic land of Pagania, destroying one of her most important cities (Kaorle).  This did not end the Neretvian resistance, as they continued to raid and steal from the Venetian occupators.

It was not until 998 that the Venetians gained the upper hand. Doge Peter II Orseolo finally crushed the Neretvians and assumed the title duke of the Dalmatians (Dux Dalmatianorum), though without conflicting Byzantine suzerainty. In 1050, the Neretvians where part of Kingdom of Croatia under King Stjepan I.

Zahumlje

Zahumlje got its name from the mountain of Hum near Bona, where the river of Buna flowed. It included two old cities: Bona and Hum. Zahumlje included parts of modern-day regions of Herzegovina and southern Dalmatia. Zahumlje's first known ruler was Michael of Zahumlje, he was mentioned together with Tomislav of Croatia in Pope John X's letter of 925. In that same year, he participated in the first church councils in Split. Michael, with grand titles of the Byzantine court as anthypatos and patrician (patrikios), remained ruler of Zahumlje through the 940s, while maintaining good relations with the Pope.

Travunia

Travunia was initially a town, present-day Trebinje, that was promoted to a fief during the rule of Vlastimir of Serbia, when he married his daughter to nobleman Krajina Belojević. It was ruled by this family until the next century, when Boleslav Petrović, the son of Predimir ruled Serbia. At this time it had the following Župania: Libomir, Vetanica, Rudina, Crusceviza, Vrmo, Rissena, Draceviza, Canali, Gernoviza. It is annexed during the rule of Pavle Branović.

Dragomir Hvalimirović restores the title of Travunia, but is murdered in the 1010s, and the maritime lands are annexed by the Byzantines, and then Serbia. Grdeša, of unknown genealogy, is given the rule of Travunia under Uroš II Prvoslav. It is part of Serbia until 1377, when Bosnian Ban Tvrtko takes the area.

Republic of Venice and the Kingdom of Hungary

As the Dalmatian city states gradually lost all protection by Byzantium, being unable to unite in a defensive league hindered by their internal dissensions, they had to turn to either Venice or Hungary for support. Each of the two political factions had support within the Dalmatian city states, based mostly on economic reasons.

The Venetians, to whom the Dalmatians were already bound by language and culture, could afford to concede liberal terms as its main goal was to prevent the development of any dangerous political or commercial competitor on the eastern Adriatic.
The seafaring community in Dalmatia looked to Venice as mistress of the Adriatic. In return for protection, the cities often furnished a contingent to the army or navy of their suzerain, and sometimes paid tribute either in money or in kind. Arbe (Rab), for example, annually paid ten pounds of silk or five pounds of gold to Venice.

Hungary, on the other hand, defeated the last Croat king in 1097 and laid claim on all lands of the Croatian noblemen since the treaty 1102. King Coloman proceeded to conquer Dalmatia in 1102–1105.
The farmers and the merchants who traded in the interior favoured Hungary as their most powerful neighbour on land that affirmed their municipal privileges.
Subject to the royal assent they might elect their own chief magistrate, bishop and judges. Their Roman law remained valid. They were even permitted to conclude separate alliances. No alien, not even a Hungarian, could reside in a city where he was unwelcome; and the man who disliked Hungarian dominion could emigrate with all his household and property. In lieu of tribute, the revenue from customs was in some cases shared equally by the king, chief magistrate, bishop and municipality.

These rights and the analogous privileges granted by Venice were, however, too frequently infringed. Hungarian garrisons were being quartered on unwilling towns, while Venice interfered with trade, the appointment of bishops, or the tenure of communal domains. Consequently, the Dalmatians remained loyal only while it suited their interests, and insurrections frequently occurred. Even in Zara four outbreaks are recorded between 1180 and 1345, although Zadar was treated with special consideration by its Venetian masters, who regarded its possession as essential to their maritime ascendancy.

The once rival Romanic and Slavic population eventually started contributing to a common civilization, and Ragusa (Dubrovnik) was the primary example of this. By the 13th century, the councilmen from ragusan names were mixed, and in the 15th century the ragusan literature was even written in the Slavic language (from which Croatian is directly descended), and the city was often called by its Slavic name, Dubrovnik. Only in 1918 Ragusa was called officially "Dubrovnik", with the creation of Yugoslavia.

The doubtful allegiance of the Dalmatians tended to protract the struggle between Venice and Hungary, which was further complicated by internal discord due largely to the spread of the Bogomil heresy, and by many outside influences.

The cities of Zara (Zadar), Spalato (Split), Trau (Trogir) and Ragusa (Dubrovnik) and the surrounding territories each changed hands several times between Venice, Hungary and the Byzantium during the 12th century.

In 1202, the armies of the Fourth Crusade rendered assistance to Venice by occupying Zadar for it. In 1204 the same army conquered Byzantium and finally eliminated the Eastern Empire from the list of contenders on Dalmatian territory.

The early 13th century was marked by a decline in external hostilities. The Dalmatian cities started accepting foreign sovereignty (mainly of the Republic of Venice) but eventually they reverted to their previous desire for independence. The Mongol invasion severely impaired Hungary, so much that in 1241, the king Béla IV had to take refuge in Dalmatia (in the Klis fortress). The Mongols attacked the Dalmatian cities for the next few years but eventually withdrew.

The Croats were no longer regarded by the city folk as a hostile people, in fact the power of certain Croatian magnates, notably the counts Šubić of Bribir, was from time to time supreme in the northern districts (in the period between 1295 and 1328).

In 1346, Dalmatia was struck by the Black Death. The economic situation was also poor, and the cities became more and more dependent on Venice.

Stephen Tvrtko, the founder of the Bosnian kingdom, was able in 1389 to annex the Adriatic littoral between Kotor (Cattaro) and Šibenik, and even claimed control over the northern coast up to Fiume (Rijeka) except for the Venetian-ruled Zara (Zadar), and his own independent ally, Ragusa (Dubrovnik). This was only temporary, as the Hungarians and the Venetians continued their struggle over Dalmatia as soon as Tvrtko died in 1391.

An internal struggle of Hungary, between king Sigismund and the Neapolitan house of Anjou, also reflected on Dalmatia: in the early 15th century, all Dalmatian cities welcomed the Neapolitan fleet except for Dubrovnik (Ragusa). The Bosnian duke Hrvoje controlled Dalmatia for the Angevins, but later switched loyalty to Sigismund.

Over the period of twenty years, this struggle weakened the Hungarian influence. In 1409, Ladislaus of Naples sold his rights over Dalmatia to Venice for 100,000 Ducats. Venice gradually took over most of Dalmatia by 1420. In 1437, Sigismund recognized Venetian rule over Dalmatia in return for 100,000 Ducats. The city of Omiš yielded to Venice in 1444, and only Ragusa (Dubrovnik) preserved temporarily its freedom.

The rule of Venice on most of Dalmatia will last nearly four centuries (1420 - 1797).

Early modern period

The Republic of Venice (1420–1796) and Dalmatian

After the fall of the Western Roman Empire, Illyrian towns on the Dalmatian coast continued to speak Latin and their language evolved relatively independent from other Romance languages, progressing towards a regional variant and finally to a distinct neo-Latin language called Dalmatian (today extinct). The earliest reference on the language dates from the 10th century and it is estimated that about 50,000 people spoke it at that time along the eastern Adriatic in the Dalmatian coast from Fiume (Rijeka) as far south as Kotor (Cattaro) in Montenegro (according to the linguist Matteo Bartoli).

The Dalmatian speakers lived mainly in the coastal towns of Zadar, Trogir, Split, Dubrovnik and Kotor (Zara, Traù, Spalato, Ragusa and Cattaro in Italian and in Dalmatian), each of these cities having a local dialect, and also on the islands of Krk, Cres and Rab (Veglia, Cherso and Arbe)

Almost every city developed its own dialect, but the most important dialects we have information on are the Vegliot a northern dialect, spoken on the island of Krk (Veglia in Italian, Vikla in Dalmatian) and the Ragusan''', a southern dialect, spoken at Dubrovnik (Ragusa in both Italian and Dalmatian).

The dialect of Zara disappeared merging with Venetian because of the strong and long lasting influence of Republic of Venice, as did the two other dialects even to the assimilation by Slavic speakers.

We know about the Dalmatian dialect of Ragusa from two letters, from 1325 and 1397, and many medieval texts, which show a language influenced heavily by Venetian. The available sources include hardly 260 Ragusan words. Surviving words include pen (bread), teta (father), chesa (house) and fachir (to do), which were quoted by an Italian, Fillipo Diversi, the head of school of Ragusa in the 1430s.

The Republic of Ragusa had at one time an important fleet, but its influence decreased. We know that the language was in trouble in the face of Croatian expansion, as the Ragusan Senate decided that all debates had to be held in Lingua veteri ragusea (ancient Romance Ragusan) and the use of the lingua sclava (Croatian) was forbidden. Nevertheless, in the 17th century, Ragusan fell out of use and became extinct.

Other languages influenced Dalmatian, but without erasing its Latin roots (superstrates): the Slavs, then the Republic of Venice. Several cities of the regions have Italian names, and other mostly the romanized Illyrian ones (like Zara, Spalato, etc.)

The oldest preserved documents written in Dalmatian are some 13th century inventories, in the Ragusan dialect. A letter of the 14th century from Zara (Zadar) shows strong Venetian influence, which was also the cause of its extinction soon after.
The Christian schism was an important factor in the history of Dalmatia. While the Croatian-held branch of the Catholic Church in Nin was under Papal jurisdiction, they still used the Slavic liturgy. Both the Latin population of the cities and the Holy See preferred the Latin liturgy, which created tensions between different dioceses. The Croatian population preferred domestic priests, who were married and bearded, and held masses in Croatian, so they were understood.

The great schism between Eastern and Western Christianity 1054 further intensified the rift between the coastal cities and the hinterland, with many of the Slavs in the hinterland preferring the Eastern Orthodoxy. Areas of today's Bosnia and Herzegovina also had an indigenous Bosnian Church which was often mistaken for Bogomils.

The Latin influence in Dalmatia was increased and the Byzantine practices were further suppressed on the general synods 1059–1060, 1066, 1075–1076 and on other local synods, notably by demoting the bishopric of Nin, installing the archbishoprics of Spalatum (Split) and Dioclea (Montenegro), and explicitly forbidding use of any liturgy other than Greek or Latin.

In the period of the rise of the Serbian state of Rascia, the Nemanjić dynasty acquired the southern Dalmatian states by the end of the 12th century, where the population was mixed Catholic and Orthodox, and founded a Serbian Orthodox bishopric of Zahumlje with see in Ston. The Nemanjić Serbia controlled several of the southern coastal cities, notably Kotor (Cattaro) and Bar (Antivari).

In the 13th century the Republic of Venice took definitive control of the Montenegro coast and created the Albania Veneta.

Dalmatia never attained a political or racial unity and never formed as a nation, but it achieved a remarkable development of art, science and literature. Politically, the neolatin Dalmatian city-states were often isolated and compelled to either fall back on the Venetian Republic for support, or tried to make it on their own.

The geographical position of the Dalmatian city states suffices to explain the relatively small influence exercised by Byzantine culture throughout the six centuries (535-1102) during which Dalmatia was part of the Eastern empire. Towards the close of this period Byzantine rule tended more and more to become merely nominal, while the influence of the Republic of Venice increased.

The medieval Dalmatia had still included much of the hinterland covered by the old Roman province of Dalmatia. However, the toponym of "Dalmatia" started to shift more towards including only the coastal, Adriatic areas, rather than the mountains inland. By the 15th century, the word "Herzegovina" would be introduced, marking the shrink of the borders of Dalmatia to the narrow littoral area where Dalmatian was spoken (which was being assimilated into the Venetian).

Ottoman and Venetian rule

The Venetian rule in Dalmatia lasted from 1420 to 1797.

An interval of peace ensued, but meanwhile the Ottoman advance continued.

Hungary was itself assailed by the Turks, and could no longer afford to try to control Dalmatia. Christian kingdoms and regions in the east fell one by one, Constantinople in 1453, Serbia in 1459, neighbouring Bosnia in 1463, and Herzegovina in 1483. Thus the Venetian and Ottoman frontiers met and border wars were incessant.

Dubrovnik sought safety in friendship with the invaders, and in one particular instance, actually sold two small strips of its territory (Neum and Sutorina) to the Ottomans in order to prevent land access from the Venetian territory.

In 1508 the hostile League of Cambrai compelled Venice to withdraw its garrison for home service, and after the overthrow of Hungary in 1526 the Turks were able easily to conquer the greater part of Dalmatia by 1537, when the Siege of Klis ended with the fall of the Klis Fortress to the Ottomans. The peace 1540 left only the maritime cities to Venice, the interior forming a Turkish province, governed from as the Sanjak of Klis, part of the Eyalet of Bosnia.

Christian Croats from the neighbouring lands now thronged to the towns, outnumbering the Romanic population even more, and making their language the primary one. The pirate community of the "uskoks" had originally been a band of these fugitives, esp. near Senia; its exploits contributed to a renewal of war between Venice and Turkey (1571–1573). An extremely curious picture of contemporary manners is presented by the Venetian agents, whose reports on this war resemble some knightly chronicle of the Middle Ages, full of single combats, tournaments and other chivalrous adventures. They also show clearly that the Dalmatian levies far surpassed the Italian mercenaries in skill and courage. Many of these troops served abroad; at the Battle of Lepanto, for example, in 1571, a Dalmatian squadron assisted the allied fleets of Spain, Venice, Austria and the Papal States to crush the Turkish navy.

The Ottomans resettled Orthodox Serbs from Bosnia into the desolated areas of the Kninska Krajina and Bukovica, while Boka Kotorska received constant Serb migrations from Herzegovina and Montenegro. The Serbs formed a significant part of the population of Dalmatia in the 16th century, with absolute majorities in the Kninska Krajina, Bukovica and Boka Kotorska. A great portion of this population fled to Venetian land and gladly fought against the Ottomans. The number of Serbs in Venetian Dalmatia rapidly increased during the War of Candia in 1645 - 1669 and the Great Turkish War in 1683 - 1699, after which the peace of Karlowitz gave Venice the whole of Dalmatia as far south as Ston, as well as the region beyond Ragusa, from Sutorina to Boka kotorska. After the Venetian-Turkish war 1714–1718, Venetian territorial gains were confirmed by the 1718 Treaty of Passarowitz.

The Venetian Republic promised the peasant population of the hinterland freedom from feudal bounds in return for their military service.

The Roman Catholic Church, as the religion of both the Venetians and the Croats, exerted the majority influence over the region. The Serbian Orthodox Church in Dalmatia built several monasteries in the hinterland such as the early 14th-century Krupa, Krka and Dragović.

Dalmatia experienced a period of intense economic and cultural growth in the 18th century, given how trade routes with the hinterland were reestablished in peace.

Because the Venetians were able to reclaim some of the inland territories in the north during the Turkish wars, the toponym of Dalmatia was no longer restricted to the coastline and the islands. The border between the Dalmatian hinterland and the Ottoman Bosnia and Herzegovina greatly fluctuated until the Morean War, when the Venetian capture of Knin and Sinj set much of the borderline at its current position.

This period was abruptly interrupted with the fall of the Venetian republic in 1797.

Modern era

Dalmatia in the Napoleonic Era

Later in 1797, in the treaty of Campo Formio, Napoleon I gave Dalmatia to Austria in return for Belgium. The republics of Ragusa (Dubrovnik) and Poljica retained their independence, and Ragusa grew rich by its neutrality during the earlier Napoleonic wars.

By the Peace of Pressburg in 1805, Istria, Dalmatia and the Bay of Kotor were handed over to France.

In 1805 Napoleon created his Kingdom of Italy around the Adriatic sea, annexing to it the former Venetian Dalmatia from Istria to Cattaro (Kotor).

In 1806, the Republic of Ragusa (Dubrovnik) finally succumbed to French troops under general Marmont. The same year a Montenegrin force supported by the Russians tried to contest the French by seizing Boka Kotorska. The allied forces pushed the French to Ragusa. The Russians induced the Montenegrins to render aid and they proceeded to take the islands of Korčula and Brač but made no further progress, and withdrew in 1807 under the Treaty of Tilsit. The Republic of Ragusa was officially annexed to the Napoleonic Kingdom of Italy in 1808.

In 1809, the War of the Fifth Coalition broke out, and French and Austrian forces also fought in the Dalmatian Campaign (1809). In the summer, Austrian forces retook Dalmatia, but this lasted only until the Treaty of Schönbrunn, when Austria ceded a number of additional provinces north of Dalmatia to France, so Napoleon removed Dalmatia from his Kingdom of Italy and created the Illyrian Provinces.

The major part of the Dalmatian population was Roman Catholic.

Habsburg Austrian rule

In the course of the War of the Sixth Coalition, the Austrian Empire declared war on France in 1813, restored control over Dalmatia by 1815 and formed a temporary Kingdom of Illyria. In 1822, this was eliminated and Dalmatia was placed under Austrian administration.

After the Revolutions of 1848 and particularly since the 1860s, in the age of romantic nationalism, two main political factions appeared in Dalmatia. The first was the pro-Croatian or unionist one, led by the People's Party and the Party of Rights, which advocated for a union of Dalmatia with the remaining part of Croatia that was under Hungarian administration. The second was the autonomist, pro-Italian, called the Autonomist Party.

The Habsburg Empire had its own agenda in Dalmatia, that opposed the formation of the Italian state in the Revolutions of 1848 in the Italian states, but supported the development of Italian culture in Dalmatia, maintaining a delicate balance that primarily served its own interests. At the time, the vast majority of the rural population spoke Croatian while the city aristocracy spoke Italian. The Italian-leaning high society promulgated the idea of a separate Dalmatian national identity under the multi-ethnic Austro-Hungarian monarchy (not necessarily unified with Italy), which, coupled with a property census that gave them disproportional political representation, tended to maintain their social status.

Many Dalmatian Italians looked with sympathy towards the Risorgimento movement that fought for the unification of Italy. However, after 1866, when the Veneto and Friuli regions were ceded by the Austrians to the newly formed Kingdom Italy, Dalmatia remained part of the Austro-Hungarian Empire, together with other Italian-speaking areas on the eastern Adriatic. This triggered the gradual rise of Italian irredentism among many Italians in Dalmatia, who demanded the unification of the Austrian Littoral, Fiume and Dalmatia with Italy. The Italians in Dalmatia supported the Italian Risorgimento: as a consequence, the Austrians saw the Italians as enemies and favored the Slav communities of Dalmatia, fostering the nascent nationalism of Slovenes and Croats. During the meeting of the Council of Ministers of 12 November 1866, Emperor Franz Joseph I of Austria outlined a wide-ranging project aimed at the Germanization or Slavization of the areas of the empire with an Italian presence:

Dalmatia, especially its  maritime cities, once had a substantial local ethnic Italian population (Dalmatian Italians), making up 33% of the total population of Dalmatia in 1803, but this was reduced to 20% in 1816. According to Austrian censuses, the Dalmatian Italians formed 12.5% of the population in 1865, but this was reduced to 2.8% in 1910.

The political alliances in Dalmatia shifted over time. At the beginning, the unionists and autonomists were allied together, against centralism of Vienna. After a while, when the national question came to prominence, they split. A third splintering happened when the local Orthodox population, few of whom were nationally conscious Serbs, heard of the ideas of unification of all Serbs through of the Serbian Orthodox Church, which acted as Serbia's agit-prop agency abroad. As a result, Serbian Orthodox population started to side with the autonomists and irredentists rather than the unionists.

20th century

First half of the 20th century
In 1909 Italian lost its status as the official language of Dalmatia in favor of Croatian only (previously both languages were recognized): thus Italian could no longer be used in the public and administrative sphere.

In World War I, Austria-Hungary was defeated and it disintegrated, which helped solve the internal political conflict in Dalmatia. Under the Treaty of London 1915, Italy was to attain the northern Dalmatia (including the cities of Zadar, Sebenico (Šibenik) and Knin), but after World War I Italy obtained only a reduced area. After the war, Dalmatia became part of the Kingdom of Yugoslavia and after negotiations, only Zadar (officially called "Zara" in Italian) and the islands of Cherso (Cres), Lussino (Lussinj) and Lagosta (Lastovo) remained part of the Kingdom of Italy.

When the Croatian Banate was in 1939 formed, the biggest part of Dalmatia was in it.

In April 1941, during World War II, the Axis powers invaded and conquered Yugoslavia. A month later, large sections of Dalmatia were annexed by the Kingdom of Italy (in the Governorate of Dalmatia), the rest being formally left to the Independent State of Croatia, but in reality occupied by Italian forces which later supported Chetniks in Serb-populated areas.

Many Croats from Dalmatia  joined the resistance movement led by Tito's Partisans, while others joined the fascist Croatia of Ante Pavelić. The result was a terrible guerrilla war that ravaged all Dalmatia.

In September 1943, following the capitulation of Italy, large sections of Dalmatia were temporarily controlled by Partisans, only to be reoccupied, this time by the German Wehrmacht. In later stages of the war, many Dalmatian Croats went in exile, through fear of the Third Reich's vindictive actions, especially after strong rumours that a second front would be formed and that there would be an invasion on the Croatian coast. In the second of half 1944, Partisans, supplied by the Allies, finally took control of all  Dalmatia. The Italian population of Dalmatia, concentrated in Zara, suffered huge civilian losses due to allies bombardments in 1944.

After 1945, most of the remaining Dalmatian Italians fled the region (350,000 Italians escaped from Istria and Dalmatia in the Istrian-Dalmatian exodus). They were treated as remnants of the occupation force and were given an option to leave for Italy. Some died in the so-called foibe massacres, although this was more common in Istria and elsewhere than in Dalmatia. The "disappearance" of the Italian speaking populations in Dalmatia was nearly complete after World War II. The linguist Matteo Bartoli calculated that the Italians were 33% of the Dalmatian population during the Napoleonic wars, while currently there are only 300 Italians in the Croatian dalmatia and 500 Italians in coastal Montenegro.

After the World War II, Dalmatia was divided between three republics of socialist Yugoslavia - almost all of the territory went to Croatia, leaving Cattaro Bay of Kotor to Montenegro and a small strip of coast at Neum to Bosnia-Herzegovina.

Breakup of Yugoslavia

In 1990, when Yugoslavia began to disintegrate, Croatian leadership announced their intention to declare independence, which they would indeed declare in 1991. The first Dalmatian battlefields of what would later be called the Homeland war (Domovinski rat) appeared in sections of northern Dalmatia, where there lived a significant population of Serbs. They rebelled, under encouragement and with assistance from a variety of Serbian nationalist circles, and organized their own SAO Kninska Krajina and started the so-called Log Revolution. The center of this restive area was in the northern Dalmatian town of Knin.

This Serb-held region later morphed into the SAO Krajina, and later yet it would become the Republic of Serbian Krajina (RSK), combined with other Serb-held regions across Croatia.
The establishment of the RSK was helped by the Yugoslav People's Army (JNA), as well as paramilitary troops that came from Serbia, Bosnia and Herzegovina and Montenegro. The Serbian forces had a prevalence in equipment and munitions because of JNA support, and they proceeded to commit various acts of terrorism, including shelling attacks on civilian targets.

The Yugoslav People's Army operated from their barracks, that were mostly positioned in bigger cities and strategically important points. In some bigger cities JNA had built large residential blocs, and in the opening stages of the war it was believed that those buildings would be used by sharpshooters or for reconnaissance purposes.

The battle for the control of Dalmatia during the Croatian War of Independence was fought on three main fronts:
 the land front between Knin and the cities of Zadar, Šibenik and Sinj - see Operation Coast-91
 the sea front near the city of Split - see Battle of the Dalmatian channels
 the land front near the border with Montenegro and Herzegovina - see Siege of Dubrovnik

First attempts to take over JNA facilities occurred in August in Sinj and failed, but the major action took place in September 1991. Croatian Army and police were then more successful, although most of the objects taken were repair shops, warehouses and similar facilities, either poorly defended or commanded by officers sympathetic to the Croatian cause. Major bases, commanded by die-hard officers and manned by reservists from Montenegro and Serbia, became the object of standoffs that usually ended with JNA personnel and equipment being evacuated under supervision of EEC observers. This process was completed shortly after the Sarajevo armistice in January 1992.

All non-Serb population was ethnically cleansed from controlled areas, notably the villages of Škabrnja (Škabrnja massacre) and Kijevo (siege of Kijevo). Croatian refugees, tens of thousands of them, found shelter in many of the Dalmatian coastal towns where they were placed in empty tourist facilities.

On 2 May 1991, the 1991 anti-Serb riot in Zadar happened, in which 168 Serb-owned shops were looted by Croatian civilians to stop new Serbian terrorist actions against non-Serb population on that area.

By early 1992, the military positions were mostly entrenched, and further expansion of the RSK was stopped. The Serbian forces continued terrorist actions by way of random shelling of Croatian cities, and this continued occasionally over the next four years.

Besides the northern hinterland that bordered with Bosnia and Herzegovina, the Yugoslav People's Army also occupied sections of southern Dalmatia around Dubrovnik, as well as the islands of Vis and Lastovo. These lasted until 1992.

The United Nations Protection Force (UNPROFOR) was deployed throughout the UNPA zones, including those in northern Dalmatia, as well as on Prevlaka.

The Croatian government gradually restored control over all of Dalmatia, in the following military operations:
 September 1991: September War for Šibenik - successful defence of Šibenik from JNA onslaught and takeover of JNA bases in the area.
 May and July 1992: Operation Tiger, JNA was forced to retreat from Vis, Lastovo, Mljet and areas around Dubrovnik.
 July 1992: Miljevci Heights in Šibenik hinterland, near Drniš, were liberated in the Miljevci Plateau incident
 January 1993: Operation Maslenica, Croatian forces liberated Zadar and Biograd hinterland.
 In August 1995 Croatian forces conducted Operation Storm, ending Krajina and restoring Croatian sovereignty to international recognised borders.

During Operation Storm a majority of Serb population from Krajina left their homes, while minority of those who stayed. Homes left by ethnic Serbs were taken over by ethnic Croatian refugees from Bosnia-Herzegovina with the help and encouragement of Croatian authorities. Through the past decade, number of ethnic Serb refugees have returned and gradually reverted demographic results of war in certain areas, although it is very unlikely that their proportion in region's population will ever reach pre-war levels.

21st century
The war suffering in Dalmatia was among the highest compared to the other Croatian regions, particularly in the Dalmatian hinterland, where much of the infrastructure was ruined. The tourism industry - previously the most important source of income - was deeply affected by negative publicity and did not properly recover until the late 1990s.

The Dalmatian population in general suffered a dramatic drop in living standard which created a chasm between Dalmatia and relatively more prosperous northern sections of Croatia. This chasm reflected in extreme nationalism enjoying visibly higher levels of support in Dalmatia than in the rest of Croatia, which embraced a more moderate course.

This phenomenon manifested not only in Dalmatia being a reliable stronghold for the Croatian Democratic Union and other Croatian right-wing parties, but also in mass protests against Croatian Army generals being prosecuted for war crimes. Indictment against General Mirko Norac in early 2001 drew 150,000 people to the streets of Split - which is arguably the largest protest in the history of modern Croatia.

See also

Dalmatia
History of Croatia
Italianization

References

Sources

Giuseppe Praga, Franco Luxardo, History of Dalmatia, 1993. . Google Books
 Constantine Porphyrogenitus, De administrando imperio, ed. Gy. Moravcsik and tr. R. H. J. Jenkins (1967 [1949]), Constantine Porphyrogenitus, De administrando imperio''. Washington: Dumbarton Oaks Center for Byzantine Studies.

Further reading

External links

WHKMLA History of Dalmatia
The 1908 Catholic Encyclopedia articles on Dalmatia: